Gansserina is a genus of planktonic foraminifera, included in the globigerinid family Globotruncanidae, that had a fairly wide  distribution in the Late Cretaceous (Maastrichtian). The type species is Gansserina gansseri.

The test of Gansserina is coiled in a low to flat trochospiral. The spiral side is flat, with curved, raised and oblique sutures. The umbilical side is convex with radial depressed sutures and a wide umbilicus containing portici (asymmetrical apertural flaps) and tegilla (umbilical coverings). A distinct peripheral keel runs along the edge of the spiral side while the periphery on the umbilical side may have an incompletely developed keel formed by pustules. Early chambers are globular, later ones rhomboidal in section. The wall is calcareous, perforate and pustulate, especially on the umbilical side. The  primary aperture is interiomarginal, bordered by a wide porticus (flap).

Gansserina gansseri, based on stable isotope study (C13 and O18) of specimens from Lower Maastrichtian marine sediments, is thought to have lived at intermediate depths, within the paleothermocline.

References 

 Alfred R. Loeblich Jr and Helen Tappan, 1964. Sarcodina Chiefly "Thecamoebians" and Foraminiferida; Treatise on Invertebrate Paleontology, Part C Protista 2. Geological Society of America and University of Kansas Press. 
 Loeblich, A.R and H. Tappan, 1988. Forminiferal Genera and their Classification
 Sigal Abramovich, et al 2003. Characterization of late Campanian and Maastrichtian planktonic foraminiferal depth habitats and vital activities based on stable isotopes. Palaeogeography, Palaeoclimatology, Palaeoecology 202 (2003) 1-29

Rotaliida genera
Globigerinina
Fossil taxa described in 1951